Vatnajökull (Icelandic pronunciation: , literally "Glacier of Lakes"; sometimes translated as Vatna Glacier in English) is the largest and most voluminous ice cap in Iceland, and the second largest in area in Europe after the Severny Island ice cap of Novaya Zemlya. It is in the south-east of the island, covering approximately 8% of the country.

Size
With an area of 7,900 km2, Vatnajökull is the second largest ice cap in Europe by volume (about 3,000 km3) and area (after the still larger Severny Island ice cap of Novaya Zemlya, Russia, which is in the extreme northeast of Europe). On 7 June 2008, it became a part of the Vatnajökull National Park.

Iceland's highest peak, Hvannadalshnúkur, as part of the Öræfajökull, is in the southern periphery of Vatnajökull, near Skaftafell.

Volcanoes
Under the ice cap, as under many of the glaciers of Iceland, there are several volcanoes. Eruptions from these volcanoes have led to the development of large pockets of water beneath the ice, which may burst the weakened ice and cause a jökulhlaup (glacial lake outburst flood). During the last ice age, numerous volcanic eruptions occurred under Vatnajökull, creating many subglacial eruptions.

In more modern times, the volcanoes continue to erupt beneath the glaciers, resulting in many documented floods. The volcanic lake Grímsvötn was the source of a large jökulhlaup in 1996. There was also a considerable but short-lived eruption of the volcano under these lakes at the beginning of November 2004. On 21 May 2011 a volcanic eruption started in Grímsvötn in Vatnajökull National Park at around 19:00.

In culture
An Icelandic older name for Vatnajökull was Klofajökull , which is known from eighteenth-century sources such as the writings of Eggert Ólafsson and Bjarni Pálsson. In September 1950, a Douglas DC-4 operated by the private airline Loftleiðir crash-landed on the Vatnajökull glacier. The entire six-person crew survived. A rescue operation was launched after the crew managed to send a distress signal on the fourth day. The crew and the rescue team walked the 34 km to safety.

The glacier was used as the setting for the opening sequence (set in Siberia) of the 1985 James Bond film A View to a Kill, in which Bond (played for the last time by Roger Moore) eliminated a host of armed villains before escaping in a submarine to Alaska. Several other films, including another in the Bond franchise, have been filmed on or using Jökulsárlón, the terminal lake of the Breiðamerkurjökull outlet from Vatnajökull.

In 2004, Vatnajökull was one of several Icelandic settings visited on the first leg of The Amazing Race 6.

Westlife's official music video for their twenty-fifth single top 10 and #2 UK hit in 2009 "What About Now" is the last film of Vatnajökull Glacier before the subsequent volcanic eruption.

In November 2011, the glacier was used as a shooting location for the second season of the HBO fantasy TV series Game of Thrones.

Outlet glaciers

Vatnajökull has around 30 outlet glaciers flowing from the ice cap.  The Icelandic term for glacier is "jökull", and so is the term for outlet glacier.  Given below is a list of outlet glaciers flowing from Vatnajökull, sorted by the four administrative territories of Vatnajökull National Park.  This is not a complete list.

Southern territory
 Breiðamerkurjökull
 Brókarjökull 
 Falljökull 
 Fjallsjökull 
 Fláajökull 
 Heinabergsjökull 
 Hoffellsjökull
 Hólárjökull 
 Hrútárjökull 
 Kvíárjökull 
 Lambatungnajökull 
 Morsárjökull 
 Skaftafellsjökull 
 Skálafellsjökull 
 Skeiðarárjökull 
 Stigárjökull 
 Svínafellsjökull 
 Viðborðsjökull 
 Virkisjökull 

Eastern territory
 Brúarjökull 
 Eyjabakkajökull 
 Kverkjökull 

Northern territory
 Dyngjujökull

Western territory
 Köldukvíslarjökull 
 Síðujökull 
 Skaftárjökull 
 Sylgjujökull 
 Tungnaárjökul

See also
 Geography of Iceland
 Iceland plume
 Vatnajökull National Park

References

External links

 News about Vatnajokull National park
 Search engine and map of Iceland
 Viewfinder Panoramas
  Baldursson, S, J Guðnason, H Hannesdóttir & T Thórðarson.  Nomination of Vatnajökull National Park for inclusion in the World Heritage List, Reykjavik 2018, Vatnajökull National Park

Highlands of Iceland
Ice caps
Bodies of ice of Iceland
East Volcanic Zone of Iceland
Öræfajökull Belt